George E. Smith (March 2, 1927 - October 1, 2011), nicknamed "Sonny," was a sportsman who played Negro league baseball for the Harlem Globetrotters from 1948 to 1950 and the Chicago American Giants of the Negro American League from 1951to 1952.

He also played basketball as a guard and forward for the Harlem Globetrotters from 1948 to 1954.

References

1927 births
2011 deaths
Harlem Globetrotters players
Chicago American Giants players
20th-century African-American sportspeople
21st-century African-American people